The Rag Trade is a British television sitcom broadcast by the BBC between 1961 and 1963 and by LWT between 1977 and 1978. Although a comedy, it shed light on gender, politics and the "class war" on the factory floor.

The scripts were written by partners Chesney and Wolfe, who later wrote Wild, Wild Women, Meet the Wife and On the Buses. Wild, Wild Women was a period variation of The Rag Trade.

Synopsis
The action centred on a fictional small clothing workshop (the title is a reference to the textile industry), Fenner's Fashions in London. Although run by Harold Fenner (Peter Jones) and the foreman and pattern cutter Reg Turner (Reg Varney), the female workers are led by militant shop steward Paddy Fleming (Miriam Karlin), ever ready to strike, with the catchphrase "Everybody out!" Other cast members included Sheila Hancock (as Carole Taylor), Esma Cannon (as Lily Swann), Wanda Ventham (as Shirley) in series 2 and Barbara Windsor (as Gloria, during series 1, who later returned as Judy in series 3) replacing Sheila Hancock.

In 1975, a colour pilot was made, with only Peter Jones reprising his role, this colour pilot featured a young Tony Robinson (replacing Reg Varney), Gaye Brown (briefly replacing Karlin), Jumoke Debayo, Diane Langton, Annabel Leventon, Jamila Massey, Mollie Maureen (replacing Esma Cannon) and Trixie Scales.

The theme tune for this colour pilot was performed by Alex Welsh and his Band, however, this was never transmitted, as the BBC rejected the colour revival of the series.

Two years later, the series was revived by ITV company LWT, with Jones and Karlin reprising their roles. The 1977–78 version ran for two series, most of the scripts being based on the BBC episodes from the 1960s, and featured Anna Karen (reprising her role as Olive from On the Buses) and future EastEnders star Gillian Taylforth as factory workers.

The theme tune for the LWT series was written and performed by Lynsey de Paul (credited as Joan Brown) and released as a track on an album of T.V. themes that also featured another de Paul penned theme "Hi Summer".

In 1990, the series was remade as the series Fredrikssons Fabrikk by NRK in Norway, it ran for three seasons (1990–93, 17 half hours and one 45min special) and a feature film version Fredrikssons Fabrikk – The Movie in 1994 with a script credited to Chesney and Wolfe, and Norwegian series writer Andreas Markusson.

Cast

1961–1963

 Peter Jones as Harold Fenner
 Miriam Karlin as Paddy Fleming
 Reg Varney as Reg Turner
 Esma Cannon as Lily Swann (series 1–2)
 Sheila Hancock as Carole Taylor (series 1–2)
 Barbara Windsor as Gloria (series 1) and Judy (series 3)
 Ann Beach as Brenda (series 1)
 Rita Smythe as Rita (series 1)
 Wanda Ventham as Shirley (series 2–3)
 Patricia Denys as Betty (series 3)
 Stella Tanner as Olive (series 3)
 Carmel Cryan as Gloria (series 3)
 Amanda Reiss as Janet (series 3)
 Irene Handl as Mrs Turner (series 3)

1977–1978
 Peter Jones as Harold Fenner
 Miriam Karlin as Paddy Fleming
 Anna Karen as Olive Rudge
 Christopher Beeny as Tony
 Gillian Taylforth as Lyn
 Diane Langton as Kathy
 Deddie Davies as Mabel
 Lucita Lijertwood as Jojo
 Rowena Cooper as Mrs Fenner (series 1)
 Joy Stewart as Mrs Fenner (series 2)

TV episodes
On original transmission many episodes of the original BBC TV series of The Rag Trade were not given titles, so some are from production notes and repeat screenings.

Original BBC TV series

Series 1 (1961)

Series 2 (1962)

Christmas Night with the Stars
25 December 1962 – featured a short sketch. (Has been lost)

Series 3 (1963)

Colour pilot (1975)

LWT relaunch series

Series 4 (1977)

Christmas special (1977)

Series 5 (1978)

Missing episodes
Because of the BBC's wiping policy of that era, of the 36 episodes made only 21 episodes of the original BBC Television version (1961–62) still exist in the BBC archives.

The first series of the original BBC TV version of the show is complete, whilst the second series remains incomplete, as two episodes remain missing. Only one of the 13 episodes of the third (and final) BBC TV series (1963) currently exists – "Baby Dolls", which was confirmed to have been unearthed by Philip Morris of the Television International Enterprises Archive and returned to the BBC in 2018.

DVD release
The 8 (out of the 10) existing episodes of the first series (broadcast in 1961) were released on DVD (DD Home Entertainment) in March 2006, followed by the 11 existing episodes of the second series (broadcast in 1962), released on DVD 7 months later in October 2006.

A box-set consisting all the remaining episodes from the first two series of the show was later released (through Simply Media DVD) on 23 October 2017.

All the episodes of both colour series 4 and 5 of the (1977–78) LWT version of the series, including the 1977 Christmas special, have been released on DVD by Network.

See also
 Never Mind the Quality, Feel the Width – ITV sitcom

References

External links

1961 British television series debuts
1978 British television series endings
1960s British sitcoms
1960s British workplace comedy television series
BBC television sitcoms
1970s British sitcoms
1970s British workplace comedy television series
Black-and-white British television shows
English-language television shows
ITV sitcoms
Television shows set in London
Lost BBC episodes
London Weekend Television shows
Television series by ITV Studios
On the Buses

no:Fredrikssons fabrikk
sv:Fredrikssons fabrik